Johann Heinrich Freese (17 February 1918 – 8 July 1941) was a German swimmer who competed in the 1936 Summer Olympics. He was killed in action during the Second World War.

Personal life
Free served in the German Army during the Second World War. He was severely wounded during the Siege of Leningrad, and died of his wounds in Bremen. Feldwebel in the German Army.

References

1918 births
1941 deaths
German male swimmers
German male freestyle swimmers
Olympic swimmers of Germany
Swimmers at the 1936 Summer Olympics
Sportspeople from Bremen
European Aquatics Championships medalists in swimming
German Army personnel killed in World War II
German Army soldiers of World War II
20th-century German people
Military personnel from Bremen